Asia Overland by Mark Elliott and Wil Klass was an idiosyncratic book of the 1990s which developed a minor cult following amongst backpackers in Asia and the former Soviet Union. Although it has been out of print since 2002, the book remains a talking point amongst older travellers. Its unique feature was that practical information was displayed in a set of schematic 'treasure maps' rather than in run-on text, a style later replicated in certain other books by Trailblazer,.

Between maps, the book's writing offered a way to inspire questions and investigation more than providing answers in the style of more classic Lonely Planet style guides. The guide gained a certain notoriety by explaining 'tricks' for crossing ex-Soviet borders semi-legally, for reaching Iraqi Kurdistan when that area was still little known to exist, and for getting into North Korea without a visa. Today these tips appear extremely foolhardy but at the time the book was written (largely pre-Internet) they worked and caused much excitement amongst travellers of the era. Despite considerable interest from the public, there has been no follow-up edition and at times second-hand copies of the original edition have been offered at relatively exorbitant prices on Amazon and eBay.

Trivia
The book contains several hidden in-jokes including 'towns' on maps named after friends of the authors (Bakus, Danigrad etc.).

Asia Overland was the first practical guide book in English to cover the ex-Soviet Caucasus region after the breakup of the USSR.

 Page count = 567
 Map count = 452
 Publisher = Trailblazer
 Publishing date = 1998

References

Travel guide books
Books about Asia
British travel books
English non-fiction books